The 2017–18 season was Shirak's 27th consecutive season in the Armenian Premier League. Shirak finished the season in 4th place after they were deducted 12 points in May 2018 as it was alleged that Shirak's sporting director Ararat Harutyunyan had offered Edward Kpodo of Banants a bride to fix their upcoming match. Shirak were knocked out of the Armenian Cup by Gandzasar Kapan at the Semifinal stage and the Europa League by Gorica in the first qualifying round.

Squad

Transfers

In

Out

Released

Competitions

Armenian Supercup

Premier League

Results summary

Results

Table

Armenian Cup

UEFA Europa League

Qualifying rounds

Statistics

Appearances and goals

|-
|colspan="14"|Players who left Shirak during the season:

|}

Goal scorers

Clean sheets

Disciplinary Record

References

Shirak SC seasons
Shirak
Shirak